The canton of Oisans-Romanche is an administrative division of the Isère department, eastern France. It was created at the French canton reorganisation which came into effect in March 2015. Its seat is in Vizille.

It consists of the following communes:
 
Allemond
Auris
Besse
Le Bourg-d'Oisans
Chamrousse
Clavans-en-Haut-Oisans
Les Deux Alpes
Le Freney-d'Oisans
La Garde
Huez
Livet-et-Gavet
Mizoën
Montchaboud
La Morte
Notre-Dame-de-Mésage
Ornon
Oulles
Oz
Saint-Barthélemy-de-Séchilienne
Saint-Christophe-en-Oisans
Saint-Martin-d'Uriage
Saint-Pierre-de-Mésage
Séchilienne
Vaujany
Vaulnaveys-le-Bas
Vaulnaveys-le-Haut
Villard-Notre-Dame
Villard-Reculas
Villard-Reymond
Vizille

References

Cantons of Isère